The National Congress for Timorese Reconstruction (CNRT) is a political party in East Timor founded by former President Xanana Gusmão in March 2007 in preparation for the 2007 parliamentary election.

According to provisional results, the party won 24.10% of the vote in the 2007 election, placing second behind FRETILIN, which won 29%. Based on the results, the CNRT would have 18 seats in parliament. In early July, the CNRT agreed to form a coalition with the Timorese Social Democratic Association–Social Democratic Party alliance and the Democratic Party to gain a parliamentary majority. The party, with its coalition partners, participated in talks with FRETILIN later in the month, with President José Ramos-Horta calling for the formation of a national unity government, but these talks were not successful. After weeks of dispute between the CNRT-led coalition and FRETILIN over who should form the government, Ramos-Horta announced on 6 August that the coalition would form the government and that Gusmão would become Prime Minister.

The main party of three-party coalition, Alliance of Change for Progress (AMP), National Congress for Timorese Reconstruction, led by independence hero Xanana Gusmao, was in power from 2007–17, but leader of Fretilin  Mari Alkatiri formed a coalition government after July 2017  parliamentary election. However, the new minority government soon fell, meaning second general election in May 2018. In June 2018,  former president and independence fighter Jose Maria de Vasconcelos known as Taur Matan Ruak of three-party coalition, Alliance of Change for Progress (AMP), became the new prime minister.

Election results

Presidential elections

Legislative elections

References

Political parties established in 2007
Political parties in East Timor